Leslie Keith Marden (23 September 1919 – 20 January 2002) was an Australian rules footballer who played with Carlton in the Victorian Football League (VFL).

Notes

External links 

Les Marden's profile at Blueseum

1919 births
2002 deaths
Carlton Football Club players
Australian rules footballers from Melbourne
People from Brighton, Victoria